Transportes Aéreos Bolivianos (abbreviated TAB and also known as TAB Airlines, TAB Aerocarga or TAB Cargo) is a cargo airline which operates civil cargo flights between Bolivia and the United States.

History

TAB was set up in 1977 as a sub-division of the Air Transport Management of the Bolivian Air Force in 1977, originally operating on-demand medium to long-haul heavy cargo flights using a fleet of Lockheed C-130 Hercules transport aircraft, which were based at El Alto International Airport in La Paz. In 1992, TAB was shut down.

In 1999, the airline was reactivated as a civil company based at Cochabamba, then operating a single military C-130 and a L-382, the civil variant of the preceding. In 1999, TAB moved 84,649 kilograms of cargo, which was increased to over 2 million kilograms in 2000, to 4,176,429 kilograms in 2006.

TAB increased its fleet with the addition of two McDonnell Douglas DC-10s. Currently, the airline is transporting more than 8 thousand tons a year.

In 2014, TAB retired all of its C-130, L-382, DC-10s. It stopped flying most of its MD-10s in 2014, and sold them off to the Bolivian Airforce.

Destinations
As of May 2019, TAB operates scheduled flights to the following destinations:

TAB additionally serves a wide range of charter routes.

Fleet

Current fleet
The TAB fleet consists of the following aircraft (as of January 2023):

Former fleet

See also
List of airlines of Bolivia

References

External links
Official site

Airlines of Bolivia
Military airlines
Airlines established in 1977
Bolivian companies established in 1977
Cochabamba